Barma may refer to:

The autonym of the Baguirmi people of Chad
Barma (crater), a crater on Mercury

People
Middle name
Kocc Barma Fall (1586-1655), Senegalese philosopher

 Barma (surname), surname

Fiction
Parashor Barma, a fictional detective character made by Bengali writer Premendra Mitra

See also
Burma